Senniger Powers LLP was a law firm in the city of St. Louis, Missouri. The firm merged with Stinson Leonard Street, a Kansas City, Missouri-based general practice firm, on October 1, 2018.

References

Law firms based in St. Louis
2018 disestablishments in Missouri
Year of establishment missing